Colonel Robert Hope Moncrieff Aitken  (8 February 1826 – 18 September 1887) was a Scottish recipient of the Victoria Cross, the highest and most prestigious award for gallantry in the face of the enemy that can be awarded to British and Commonwealth forces.

Details of Nomination
He was 31 years old, and a lieutenant in the 13th Bengal Native Infantry, Bengal Army during the Indian Mutiny when the following deeds took place for which he was awarded the VC:

Later life

In later life he achieved the rank of colonel.

He died in 1887 and is buried in the Eastern Cemetery at St Andrews on the upper terrace.

Family

Robert was the son of John Aitken and Jane Christie, of Cupar, Fife, Scotland. He came from a long line of army personnel. His cousin Robert Digby-Jones also received the Victoria Cross (posthumously) for actions at Ladysmith in 1900.

Legacy

His Victoria Cross is now part of the Collections at the National Army Museum (Chelsea, England). He is unique in that the decoration ceremony was performed at the same place, the Residency at Lucknow, and almost on the exact spot where several of his V.C. actions had taken place. He did not, however, receive the actual 'medal' on this occasion, as it had been mislaid.

A memorial was erected at the Residency in Lucknow. It reads:

References

Publications
Monuments To Courage (David Harvey, 1999)
The Register of the Victoria Cross (This England, 1997)
Scotland's Forgotten Valour (Graham Ross, 1995)

External links
Burial location of Robert Aitken (Fife)
Location of Robert Aitken's Victoria Cross National Army Museum, London

British recipients of the Victoria Cross
Indian Rebellion of 1857 recipients of the Victoria Cross
British Indian Army officers
British East India Company Army officers
1826 births
1887 deaths
Companions of the Order of the Bath
People from Cupar
British military personnel of the Second Anglo-Sikh War
British people in colonial India